is a passenger railway station in the city of Funabashi, Chiba Prefecture, Japan, operated by the private railway operator Keisei Electric Railway.

Lines
Keisei Nakayama Station is served by the Keisei Main Line, and is located 20.8 km from the terminus of the line at Keisei Ueno Station.

Station layout
The station consists of two elevated opposed side platforms connected via an underpass to the station building underneath.

Platforms

History
Keisei Nakayama Station was opened on 3 November 1915.

Station numbering was introduced to all Keisei Line stations on 17 July 2010. Keisei Nakayama was assigned station number KS18.

Passenger statistics
In fiscal 2019, the station was used by an average of 3,766 passengers daily.

Surrounding area
 Higashiyama Kaii Memorial Hall
 Ichikawa Municipal Fourth Junior High School
 Funabashi City Western Public Hall

See also
 List of railway stations in Japan

References

External links

  

Railway stations in Japan opened in 1915
Railway stations in Chiba Prefecture
Keisei Main Line
Funabashi